Soothsayer may refer to:

 One practicing divination, including:
 Fortune-telling
 Haruspex
 Oracle
 Prophet
 Precognition

Music
 Soothsayers (band), a London-based Afrobeat and reggae group
 The Soothsayer, an album by Wayne Shorter, 1979
 "Soothsayer", a song by Amorphis from The Beginning of Times, 2011
 "Soothsayer", a song by Buckethead from Crime Slunk Scene, 2006
 "Soothsayer", a song by Hallucinogen, 1995
 "Soothsayer", a song by the Mars Volta from The Bedlam in Goliath, 2008
 "Soothsayer", a song by Of Monsters and Men from Fever Dream, 2019

Other uses
 Soothsayer (horse) (1808–1827), a British Thoroughbred racehorse and sire
 Soothsayer (moth) or Graphiphora augur, a moth in the family Noctuidae
 Soothsayer, a 1991 science-fiction novel by Mike Resnick